Fermín Hontou, also known by his nickname Ombú (11 September 1956 – 25 August 2022), was a Uruguayan cartoonist, illustrator, and caricaturist.

He worked for several press media, such as Opción, Jaque, La Hora Popular, El Dedo, Guambia, Brecha, Aquí, Cuadernos de Marcha, El País, Unomásuno, Caminos del Aire, Snif, Monga (Brazil), Fierro (Argentina), El Ojo Clínico (Spain), La Voce, La República, Playboy (Italy), Courrier International, and Le Monde (France).

Awards 
 1990: Concurso para Logotipo de la 1.ª Feria Nacional de Artesanías (with Pablo Casacuberta).
 2000: VIII Salón Internacional de dibujo para prensa, Porto Alegre.
 2014: Fraternity Award, granted by B'nai B'rith Uruguay.

References 

1956 births
2022 deaths
Uruguayan caricaturists
Fraternity Award
Artists from Montevideo